Maggia is a fictional international crime syndicate appearing in American comic books published by Marvel Comics. The organization exists in Marvel's main shared universe, known as Earth-616, as well as other Marvel universes. Its structure is somewhat similar to the real-world New York Mafia (which is itself rarely mentioned in Marvel publications), but the Maggia differs in that it frequently hires supervillains and mad scientists to work for them. Some of the prominent Maggia members are supervillains themselves, such as Hammerhead, Silvermane, Count Nefaria and his daughter Madame Masque. The Maggia has come into conflict with various superheroes, including Spider-Man, Daredevil, the Fantastic Four, and the Avengers.

Comic creator Scott Shaw believes that the Maggia were created to avoid offending the real-life Mafia, as some comic book distributors had Mafia ties in the 1960s. Since their debut in comics, the Maggia have been adapted into several forms of media, including television series and video games.

The Maggia appeared in the second season of the Marvel Cinematic Universe television series Agent Carter, with the Los Angeles branch led by Joseph Manfredi portrayed by Ken Marino.

Publication history 
The Maggia first appeared in The Avengers #13 (February 1965) and was created by Stan Lee and Don Heck.

Fictional organization history 
The Maggia is an international crime syndicate that is the world's most powerful organization dedicated to conventional crime (as opposed to subversive activities). Originating in southern Europe, the Maggia spread throughout non-Communist Europe and the Americas. Its presence in the United States first came to public attention in the 1890s, and the Maggia's widespread bootlegging of illegal liquor during the Prohibition Era has become legendary. Today the Maggia controls most of the illegal gambling, loan-sharking, and narcotics trade in the United States, as well as many legal gambling casinos in Atlantic City, New Jersey and Las Vegas, Nevada. It also has great influence within various labor unions, and controls politicians on every level of government. Especially in recent years, the Maggia has invested many of its illegal gains into legitimate businesses. However, the Maggia enforces a strict code of secrecy among its members, and does not hesitate to punish betrayals and failures with death. The Maggia is not a monolithic organization but is instead a coalition of many virtually independent groups known as "families." The leading members of each family are usually connected through familial or marital ties. The Maggia also has affiliations with other criminal groups such as the Morgan organization in New York City's Harlem.

With Bruno Karnelli's leadership, the loss of Silvermane, and Hammerhead siding with Mister Negative, the Maggia is thrown into chaos until Mysterio appears and uses robot duplicates of the dead Maggia members. When the Hawkeyes Kate Bishop and Clint Barton attempted to make a difference in the lives of everyday people by fighting organized crime, several New York crime families, including the Maggia, struck back against them.

During the "Infinity" storyline, it was revealed that the Nobili Family are members of the Maggia where some of its members turned out to be descendants of some Inhumans.

Known Maggia families 

Several "families" are based in the New York City area. Three of these families have come to pre-eminence:

The Silvermane Family 
Its leader is Silvio "Silvermane" Manfredi, one of the last of the legendary gangsters who came to notoriety during the 1920s and 1930s. This group conducts its activities along traditional Maggia lines, and is heavily involved with the narcotics trade. Silvermane uses unusual scientific means only for the personal goal of staving off his own death, and not for the family's activities. Although Silvermane has a son, Joseph, also known as Blackwing, his successor as family head will probably be his longtime rival, top Maggia lawyer Caesar "Big C" Cicero. Silvermane initially retained control of his organization after being turned into a cyborg, but most recently his failing health, in both human and cyborg bodies, have left him a figurehead leader at best.

The following characters have been members of the Maggia's Silvermane family:

 Blackie – Rank unknown. First appeared in The Amazing Spider-Man #75.
 Caesar Cicero – The Silvermane Family's lawyer. First appeared in The Amazing Spider-Man #73.
 Man Mountain Marko – Silvermane's top lieutenant. First appeared in The Amazing Spider-Man #73.
 Rapier – A one-time friend and partner of Silvermane named Dominic Tyrone, who sought revenge after being betrayed. Rapier used an electro-stun rapier as his main weapon. First appeared in The Spectacular Spider-Man Annual #2. Killed by Scourge of the Underworld.

The Hammerhead Family 
Dominated by middle-aged Maggia traditionalists, this family first became notorious under unusual circumstances. Perhaps in imitation of the Nefaria family, its leader, known as the "Top Man", outfitted his family hit men with costumes and advanced weaponry. He then gained ownership of the Baxter Building through questionable means, thinking that doing so would somehow give him legal title to the technology of the building's famed occupants, the Fantastic Four. The Fantastic Four defeated and captured the "Top Man", his claims to owning the Baxter Building were dismissed by the courts, and the "Top Man" was reportedly assassinated by order of his own family. The family then sought a new leader who would direct operations along thoroughly traditional lines and chose a newcomer known only as Hammerhead, an amnesia victim whose new ruthless persona had been shaped by his love for gangster films. Hammerhead uses methods from the Prohibition era, including gang wars, although he will use advanced technology for personal ends, such as the exoskeleton that magnifies his strength. In light of Hammerhead's recent loyalty shift to Mister Negative, the status of his Maggia family remains undetermined. They very normally ally with Tombstone and The Chameleon

The following characters have been members of the Maggia's Hammerhead family:

 Top Man – Former leader of the Hammerhead family. First appeared in Fantastic Four #101 (Aug 1970). Assassinated by an unknown member of his Maggia group.
 Hammerhead – Second leader of the Hammerhead family. First appeared in The Amazing Spider-Man #113 (Oct. 1972).
 Big Rock – Rank unknown. First appeared in Fantastic Four #101 (Aug. 1970).
 Blackwing (Joseph Manfredi) – Rank unknown. First appeared in Daredevil #118 (Feb. 1975).
 Eel (Edward Lavell) – One-time employee and representative of the Maggia's Gulf Coast operations. First appeared in Power Man and Iron Fist #92 (April 1983).
 Gimlet – The Top Man's lieutenant who aspired to become the next Top Man. First appeared in Fantastic Four #101 (Aug. 1970).

The Nefaria Family 
This group bears little resemblance to the rest of the Maggia. The Italian nobleman, Count Luchino Nefaria, a scientific genius, was the world's most powerful Maggia leader until his initial defeat by the Avengers. Afterwards he moved his base of operations to the New York City area, and then imprisoned Washington, D.C. within an impenetrable force-dome and held it for ransom. After his defeat and capture, his daughter Giulietta, also known as Whitney Frost, succeeded him as family head and led an unsuccessful attempt to capture the advanced weaponry of Tony Stark. She was eventually succeeded by a costumed criminal, the Masked Marauder, who demanded complete control of New York City or else he would detonate a nuclear device there. After his capture, the family again apparently came under control of Whitney Frost, by then known as Madame Masque. Contrary to standard Maggia practice, the Nefaria family, principally consisting of men under 40, has employed futuristic weaponry and even robots (like the Dreadnoughts), as well as costumed super-powered agents (Unicorn, Whiplash, Gladiator, etc.), and has launched open attacks on society. Its leader is always known as "Big M". With both Count Nefaria and Madame Masque now pursuing separate agendas, it is not known who, if anyone, currently heads the Nefaria Family.

The following characters have been members of the Maggia's Nefaria family:

 Count Nefaria – Founder of the Nefaria family. First appeared in Avengers #13 (Feb. 1965)
 Cyclone (André Gerard) – First appeared in Amazing Spider-Man #143 (April 1975). Killed by Scourge of the Underworld.
 Eel (Leopold Stryke) – Former agent. First appeared in Strange Tales #112 (Sept. 1963). Killed by Gladiator.
 Whitney Frost – Head of the Nefaria family. First appeared in Tales of Suspense #97 (Jan. 1968).
 Gladiator – Former member. First appeared in Daredevil #18 (July 1966).
 Daniel Lindy – First appeared in Spectacular Spider-Man #22 (Sept 1978).
 Masked Marauder (Frank Farnum) – Former leader of the Nefaria family. First appeared in Daredevil #16 (May 1966).
 Plantman – Former agent. First appeared in Strange Tales #113 (Oct 1963).
 Porcupine (Alexander Gentry) – Former agent. First appeared in Tales to Astonish #48 (Oct. 1963). Died in battle against Diamondback.
 Scarecrow – Former agent. First appeared in Tales of Suspense #51 (March 1964).
 Tri-Man – An android created by the Masked Marauder that copies the abilities of three low-level crooks. First appeared in Daredevil #22.
 Unicorn (Milos Masaryk) – Former agent. First appeared in Tales of Suspense #56 (Aug. 1964).
 Whiplash (Mark Scarlotti) – Former enforcer. First appeared in Tales of Suspense #97 (Jan. 1968).

The Costa Family 
The Costa Family is associated with the Maggia and was responsible for the death of Frank Castle's family, which led to Castle becoming the Punisher. At one point, they used William "Billy the Beaut" Russo (a.k.a. Jigsaw) as an enforcer and hitman.

The following members are seen in the Costa Family:

 Luis Allegre – Member of the Costa Family. First appeared in Marvel Super Action #1. Killed by the Punisher.
 Bruno Costa – Enforcer of the Costa Family and brother of Frank Costa. First appeared in Marvel Preview #2. Killed by Frank Costa's assassin Audrey.
 Byron Hannigan – Member of the Costa Family. First appeared in Marvel Super Action #1. Killed by the Punisher.
 Leon Kolsky – Member of the Costa Family. First appeared in Marvel Super Action #1. He was killed when the Punisher tricked him into firing on an aquarium tank that contained a shark.
 Matt Skinner – Member of the Costa Family. First appeared in Marvel Super Action #1. Killed by the Punisher.

The Nobili Family 
The Nobili Family is a struggling Maggia family. It turns out that some of the members of the Nobili Family are descendants of some Inhumans.

The following members are seen in the Nobili Family.

 Gordon "Gordo" Nobili – The patriarch of the Nobili family. First appeared in Thunderbolts (vol. 2) #14.
 Carmen Nobili – The son of Gordon Nobili. First appeared in Thunderbolts (vol. 2) #14. Killed during the fight against the Paguro Family, even when the Thunderbolts interfered.
 Joseph Nobili – The son of Gordon Nobili. First appeared in Thunderbolts (vol. 2) #14. Killed during the fight against the Paguro Family, even when the Thunderbolts interfered.

The Fortunato Family 
The Fortunato Family are strong opposers of Wilson Fisk who came in conflict with Spider-Man.

The following members are seen in the Fortunato Family.

 Don Fortunato – The patriarch of the Fortunato family. First appeared in Spider-Man #70.
 Jimmy-6 (Giacomo Fortunato) – The son of Don Fortunato and his top enforcer. First appeared in Spider-Man #70.
 Angelo Fortunato – The youngest son of Don Fortunato, who briefly became the host for Venom. First appeared in Marvel Knights: Spider-Man #7. Killed when he fled from a battle with Spider-Man and was abandoned by the Venom symbiote.

Other Maggia members 
The following members do not fall under the category of the other five Maggia families:

 Bobby Peculo – First appeared in Punisher: No Escape #1. Killed by the Punisher.
 Bushmaster (John McIver) – First appeared in Iron Fist #15. He was killed when the process that gave Luke Cage his powers proved to be too much for him.
 Cyclone (Pierre Fresson) – He served as a speaker for the European branches of the Maggia. First appeared in Thunderbolts #3.
 Eli Rumsford – Enforcer. First appeared in Spectacular Spider-Man #54 (May 1981)
 Gideon Mace – First appeared in Heroes for Hire #3.
 Goldbug – One-time employee. First appeared in Power Man #41.
 Grim Reaper – First appeared in Avengers #52.
 Guido Carboni – Crime Boss. First appeared in Marvel Spotlight #20 where he was depicted as a big time crime boss who held operations all across New York. One night, a cat burglar named Monty Walsh attempted to rob him, but Guido and his men shot and killed him as he was trying to escape. Unbeknownst to Guido and his men, Monty was saved by the Uni-Power and became Captain Universe. Guido found his operations falling apart due to Monty's use of the power. Guido was finally confronted by Monty, who planned to kill him and then use the power for his own selfish needs; unfortunately for Monty, the Uni-Power left him because of this and Guido was arrested by the police, raving about how a dead body had superpowers.
 Harry Dumont – First appeared in Spectacular Spider-Man #54 (May 1981)
 Mind-Master – Ruffio Costa is a crime lord who once kidnapped Robert Mallory's son Keith. First appeared in Daredevil Annual #4.
 Mysterio (Quentin Beck) – First appeared in The Amazing Spider-Man #13.
 Nautilus – An enforcer from Chicago. First appeared in Spider-Man Unlimited #6.
 Photon (Jason Dean) – First appeared in a crossover story in Nova #12 and Amazing Spider-Man #171. He was responsible for murdering Nova's uncle Ralph Rider.
 Razorwind – An enforcer from Chicago. First appeared in Spider-Man Unlimited #6.
 Shigeru Ichihara – A Maggia member who handled all Maggia activities on the Pacific Rim. First appeared in Avengers (vol. 3) #31.
 Simon Marshall – A Maggia chemist. First appeared in Cloak and Dagger #1
 Smuggler – First appeared in Avengers #21 (Oct. 1965)
 T.B. Smithson – A Maggia member who controls all Maggia activities in Texas. First appeared in Avengers (vol. 3) #31.
 Tapping Tommy – First appeared in Defenders #30.
 Trapster (Peter Petruski) – First appeared in Fantastic Four #38. He was a member of the Maggia in Thing #4.
 Vic Slaughter – Assassin. First appeared in Morbius the Living Vampire #6.
 Vincent Mangaro – A crime boss who set up a drug-dealing operation in New York. First appeared in Punisher: No Escape #1. Killed by the Punisher.

Competitors and allies 

Various criminals have attempted to unify the American East Coast's independent criminal groups so as to compete with the Maggia's domination of organized crime. Other lesser criminal organizations may in fact cooperate and work for the Maggia, pay street taxes, or manage to operate under the radar of the Maggia.

The most successful competitor of the Maggia has been the Kingpin, who, at his peak, was more powerful than all of the Maggia families combined.

As noted above, the principal leaders of all three major Maggia families are, to one extent or another, no longer in ideal leadership positions. With the Kingpin presently exiled from the U.S. in the wake of Daredevil story arcs, the potential for a power vacuum is huge, and the stage is set for a gang war between any and all challengers.

The Spider-Man villain called Mister Negative plotted to target the Maggia Families, perhaps hoping to take the Kingpin's place. The supervillain Hood has also formed a supervillain crime syndicate which enlists various costumed criminals in an attempt to gain control of the underworld.

Other lesser crime bosses include the Slug (a Miami-based drug kingpin) and the Owl. Whether they are connected to the Maggia or manage to operate separately is unknown. Don Fortunato once managed to gain control of much of New York City's underworld in the absence of the Kingpin. Although Fortunato seems to run a traditional Mafioso organized crime group, he is actually connected to the Maggia and the terrorist organization known as HYDRA. The original Mr. Fish was mentioned to have planned to start a Maggia branch in his area.

Although the Maggia organization is, for the most part, analogous in the Marvel Universe to the real-life Italian and Italian-American Mafia or La Cosa Nostra, there exist in the Marvel Universe other Italian crime families that resemble more closely the real Mafia or La Cosa Nostra. Some of these families and organizations have been referred to as "the Mafia" in recent comics, but it is unknown whether or not these families ultimately operate under Marvel's Maggia organization or are a part of a separate, more realistic La Cosa Nostra organization in the Marvel Universe. These more realistic Italian Mafia organizations are often featured in Punisher comics. As most of these organizations operate on a crew-based street level and specialize in traditional organized crime rather than superpowered organized crime, it is possible they are not connected to the more powerful Maggia. Examples of these organizations include:

 The Angelone Crime Family -
 The Gnucci Crime Family – It was known for the infamous Ma Gnucci.
 The Pazzo Crime Family -
 The Roman Crime Family -

Other versions

House of M 
In the House of M reality, the Maggia is a criminal organization that was led by Count Nefaria. The Maggia were annihilated by Magneto's Sentinels for plotting against him.

In other media

Television 
 The Maggia appears in the Iron Man: Armored Adventures. This version of the group is led by Count Nefaria, with Black Knight, Unicorn, and Killer Shrike serving under him, and are rivals of the Mandarin's gang, the Tong.
 A Los Angeles branch of the Maggia appears in season two of Agent Carter. Led by Joseph Manfredi, an old acquaintance of Howard Stark's, they are enlisted by Manfredi's former girlfriend Whitney Frost to help her in her experiments with Zero Matter.

Video games 
 The Maggia appear in the Iron Man film tie-in game. This version of the group is a weapons manufacturing company who used to be partnered with Stark Industries. When Tony Stark announces that his company is no longer producing weapons, the Maggia attempt to get revenge, but Iron Man cripples their production capabilities and forces them into bankruptcy. In an article for IGN, game director Jeffrey Tseng explained that adapting the movie script into a game was the perfect opportunity to insert characters and groups from Iron Man's history in order to fill it out. He declared "... we were looking through Iron Man's history to find characters and groups that would resonate with dedicated fans. [The] Maggia, Advanced Idea Mechanics, Titanium Man, and other characters in the game all came from this extensive research."
 The Maggia appeared in Marvel: Avengers Alliance.
 The Maggia appeared in Marvel Heroes. This version of the group is led by the Kingpin.
 The New York branch of the Maggia appears in the Spider-Man DLC The City That Never Sleeps, consisting of the Fortunato, Costa, Cicero, Mauchio, and Hammerhead families. Following the Kingpin and Mister Negative's arrests in the main game, the Maggia attempt to occupy the power vacuum and engage each other in a brutal gang war. Eager to end the war quickly, Hammerhead tries to force the other families to submit to him by employing Black Cat to steal hard drives containing their collective wealth, but she betrays him and keeps them for herself. Hammerhead seemingly kills her with a bomb, reasoning that he no longer needs the drives, and orders his men to steal advanced technology from Sable International to give them an advantage over the other families. He later kidnaps and attempts to kill the other Maggia crime lords on live television. However, Spider-Man foils his plan and defeats him. After Hammerhead escapes from police custody and transforms himself into a cyborg, Spider-Man and Sable International's head Silver Sable join forces to defeat him once more.

References

External links 
 Maggia at Marvel.com
 Maggia at Marvel Wiki
 Maggia (Earth-58163) at Marvel Wiki
 Maggia at MarvelDirectory.com
 Maggia at Comic Vine

Fictional organized crime groups
Fictional organizations in Marvel Comics
Fictional gangs
Cultural depictions of the Mafia